Verkhny Tagil is a town under the administrative jurisdiction of the Town of Kirovgrad in Sverdlovsk Oblast, Russia, located in the upper streams of the Tagil River (Tobol's basin),  northwest of Yekaterinburg, the administrative center of the oblast. Population:

History
It was founded in 1716. Town status was granted to it in 1966.

Administrative and municipal status
Within the framework of the administrative divisions, it is, together with ten rural localities, subordinated to the Town of Kirovgrad—an administrative unit with the status equal to that of the districts. As a municipal division, Verkhny Tagil, together with two rural localities, is incorporated as Verkhny Tagil Urban Okrug. The town of Kirovgrad, together with eight other rural localities, is incorporated separately as Kirovgradsky Urban Okrug.

References

Notes

Sources

Cities and towns in Sverdlovsk Oblast
Yekaterinburgsky Uyezd